Copenhagen Jazz Festival is a jazz event every July in Copenhagen, the capital of Denmark. Copenhagen Jazz Festival was established in 1979, but beginning in 1964 Tivoli Gardens presented a series of concerts under the name Copenhagen Jazz Festival with Thelonious Monk, Miles Davis and many others.

According to reports, the total attendance was 240,000 people during Copenhagen Jazz Festival in 2004. In 2006 the number of concerts increased to 850, and today Copenhagen Jazz Festival numbers more than 100 venues, 1100 concerts, and approximately 260,000 guests, making it one of the largest music events in Europe.

Musicians who have performed at the Copenhagen Jazz Festival include Sonny Rollins, Oscar Peterson, Ray Charles, Michel Petrucciani, Niels-Henning Ørsted Pedersen, Keith Jarrett, Wayne Shorter, Dizzy Gillespie, John Scofield, Herbie Hancock, Pat Metheny, Michel Camilo, Ornette Coleman, Annette Peacock, Svend Asmussen Quartet, Richard Bona, Tony Allen,  Chick Corea and Daniel Puente Encina.

History
The founding of Copenhagen Jazz Festival in 1979 is closely linked to the jazz scene that evolved in Copenhagen in the 1960s, when the city served as a European home for American jazz musicians like Dexter Gordon, Ben Webster and Kenny Drew. An inspired music scene attracted even more American musicians and educated and inspired the whole Danish scene as well.

Through the 70s jazz music expanded in terms of genres and audiences, and reaching 1978 lawyer and project manager Poul Bjørnholt (from Københavns City Center) took the initiative to Copenhagen Jazz Festival, when realizing how local jazz clubs, public spaces, theaters and large venues could contribute to this collaborative event.

From 1979 and until the 90s the festival grew at a steady pace - making room for both international artists and local bands - and today Copenhagen Jazz Festival is its biggest ever with more than 100 venues in Copenhagen and over 1000 concerts. That makes Copenhagen Jazz Festival one of Copenhagen's most important public festivals, attracting a broad international audience.

Venues
 Copenhagen Jazzhouse
 Det Kongelige Teater
 Operaen
 Koncerthuset
 Den Sorte Diamant
 La Fontaine
 Jazzhus Montmartre
 Tivoli
 Jazzcup
 Det Kongelige Danske Haveselskab
 Charlottenborg
 Kongens Have
 Huset i Magstræde
 Skuespilhuset
 Christianshavn Beboerhus
 Jazz Club Loco
 Christianskirken
 Kulturhuset Islands Brygge
 Pressen, Politikens Hus
 Prøvehallen
 Amager Bio
 and more

Festival 1979–2017

Pre-Copenhagen concerts 1962–1974

Poster artists 
 1979: N/A       
 1980: N/A
 1981: N/A
 1982: Pia Schutzmann
 1983: Per Arnoldi
 1984: Niels Reumert
 1985: Bo Bonfils
 1986: Jens Jørgen Thorsen
 1987: Hans Henrik Lerfeldt
 1988: Tom Krøjer
 1989: Bent Carl Jacobsen
 1990: Erik Rasmussen
 1991: Poul Janus Ipsen
 1992: Knud Odde
 1993: Egon Fischer
 1994: Leif Sylvester
 1995: Jørgen Nash
 1996: Lars Ravn
 1997: Henrik Have
 1998: Dorte Dahlin
 1999: Per Kirkeby
 2000: Bjørn Nørgaard
 2001: Ejler Bille
 2002: Ib Spang Olsen
 2003: Per Arnoldi
 2004: Evren Tekinoktay
 2005: HuskMitNavn
 2006: Jonas Hecksher / e-types
 2007: Henrik Vibskov
 2008: Kasper Eistrup
 2009: Tal R
 2010: Søren Solkær Starbird
 2011: Kirstine Roepstorff
 2012: Leo Scherfig
 2013: Søren Benchke / Papfar
 2014: Mikkel Sommer
 2015: Julie Nord
 2016: Halfdan Pisket
 2017: Rasmus Meisler
 2018: Christiane Spangsberg

References

External links
 Official website of Copenhagen Jazz Festival

Festivals in Copenhagen
Jazz festivals in Denmark
Summer events in Denmark